Pollina is a surname. Notable people with the surname include:

 Adam Pollina, American comic-book artist
 Anthony Pollina (born 1952), American politician from the Vermont Progressive Party
 Billy Pollina (born 1961), American television and film producer

See also
 Pollina